Obrov may refer to:
 Obrov, Montenegro
 Obrov, Hrpelje-Kozina, Slovenia